The 2018 Gold Coast Titans season was the 12th in the club's history. The Titans completed the NRL's 2018 Telstra Premiership in 14th place, out of 16 teams, and did not qualify for the finals.

Ladder

Player Movements

Gains

Losses

Fixtures

Regular season

References

Gold Coast Titans seasons
Gold Coast Titans season